Jörgen Joakim Nilsson (born 6 February 1994) is a Swedish professional footballer who plays as a centre-back for Major League Soccer club St. Louis City SC.

Career
In November 2012 Nilsson was handed his first professional contract by GIF Sundsvall.

In February 2016 he signed a five-year contract with IF Elfsborg for a fee around €500,000 (5 million SEK).

In July 2019, Nilsson joined 2. Bundesliga side Arminia Bielefeld having agreed a three-year contract. The transfer fee paid to Elfsborg was estimated at €400,000.

In June 2022, Nilsson agreed to a free transfer to St. Louis City SC. He joined the club in July 2022 and the club itself will begin playing in the MLS in 2023.

Personal life
He is younger brother to the former Sweden national team player Per Nilsson.

Career statistics

International

References

External links
 
 
 
 
 

1994 births
Living people
People from Härnösand
Association football defenders
Swedish footballers
Sweden international footballers
Sweden youth international footballers
Sweden under-21 international footballers
Footballers at the 2016 Summer Olympics
Olympic footballers of Sweden
Allsvenskan players
Bundesliga players
2. Bundesliga players
GIF Sundsvall players
IF Elfsborg players
Arminia Bielefeld players
Swedish expatriate footballers
Swedish expatriate sportspeople in Germany
Expatriate footballers in Germany
Swedish expatriate sportspeople in the United States
Expatriate soccer players in the United States
Sportspeople from Västernorrland County